Testosterone propionate/testosterone enanthate (TE/TP), sold under the brand name Testoviron depot, is an oil-based mixture of testosterone esters for depot intramuscular injection which is marketed in Europe. Its constituents include:

 Testosterone propionate (TP) (20 mg, 25 mg, or 50 mg)
 Testosterone enanthate (TE) (55 mg, 110 mg, or 200 mg)

See also
 List of combined sex-hormonal preparations § Androgens
 Deposterona
 Omnadren
 Sustanon (disambiguation)

References

Androgens and anabolic steroids
Androstanes
Combined androgen formulations
Prodrugs
Testosterone